Bertrand Vili (born 6 September 1983) is a French former track and field athlete who competed in the discus throw. He represented France at the 2009 World Championships in Athletics and was a silver medallist at the 2005 Jeux de la Francophonie. He was a double shot put/discus gold medallist at the 2001 South Pacific Mini Games and also won javelin throw silver. He won the gold medal in the discus at the 2007 Pacific Games in a games record of 58.31 m. He successfully defended that title four years later at the 2011 Pacific Games, held in his native New Caledonia.

He won three straight national titles at the French Athletics Championships from 2007 to 2009. He has also won at the Australian Athletics Championships (2009) and won a shot put and two discus titles at the New Zealand Athletics Championships between 2002 and 2004.

In 2006 he wrote off his car in an accident while narrowly beneath the drink-drive limit. He was married to fellow athlete Valerie Adams from 2004 to 2010, with Adams citing Vili's drinking as a cause of their marital breakdown in her autobiography. His cousin Laurent Vili is a former shot putter and rugby player.

International competitions

Positions in qualifying rounds (q) are overall positions in the round including all groups.

National titles
French Athletics Championships
Discus throw: 2007, 2008, 2009
New Zealand Athletics Championships
Shot put: 2002
Discus throw: 2003, 2004
Australian Athletics Championships
Discus throw: 2009

See also
List of discus throw national champions (men)
List of Australian athletics champions (men)

References

External links

1983 births
Living people
French male discus throwers
French male shot putters
French male hammer throwers
New Caledonian male athletes
World Athletics Championships athletes for France